The rufous-breasted warbling finch (Poospiza rubecula) is a species of bird in the family Thraupidae.
It is endemic to Peru.

Its natural habitats are subtropical or tropical dry forests and subtropical or tropical high-altitude shrubland.
It is threatened by habitat loss.

References

External links
BirdLife Species Factsheet.

rufous-breasted warbling finch
Birds of the Peruvian Andes
Endemic birds of Peru
rufous-breasted warbling finch
rufous-breasted warbling finch
Taxonomy articles created by Polbot